Shahi Sara (also Romanized as Shāhī Sarā; also known as Khomeynī Sarā and Shāh Sarā) is a village in Machian Rural District, Kelachay District, Rudsar County, Gilan Province, Iran. At the 2006 census, its population was 61, in 21 families.

References 

Populated places in Rudsar County